Afgan Bayramov (born 14 October 1983) is an Azerbaijani weightlifter. He competed for Azerbaijan at the 2008 Summer Olympics where he finished seventh and the 2012 Summer Olympics where his participation was not successful.

References

Azerbaijani male weightlifters
Weightlifters at the 2008 Summer Olympics
Weightlifters at the 2012 Summer Olympics
Olympic weightlifters of Azerbaijan
1983 births
Living people
Sportspeople from Baku
European Weightlifting Championships medalists
20th-century Azerbaijani people
21st-century Azerbaijani people